The Turks and Caicos Islands requires its residents to register their motor vehicles and display vehicle registration plates. Current plates are North American standard 6 × 12 inches (152 × 300 mm). Vehicle plates have five digits on them, some with the text 'Beautiful by Nature' and 'Turks and Caicos Islands', others starting with the letters 'TC'.

See also 
 Vehicle registration plates of British overseas territories

References

Turks and Caicos Islands
Transport in the Turks and Caicos Islands
Turks and Caicos Islands-related lists